The Little Wildcat is a 1928 American comedy drama film directed by Ray Enright and starring Audrey Ferris, James Murray and Robert Edeson.

Cast
 Audrey Ferris as Audrey  
 James Murray as Conrad Burton  
 Robert Edeson as Joel Ketchum  
 George Fawcett as Judge Holt  
 Hallam Cooley as Victor Sargeant  
 Doris Dawson as Sue

Preservation status
All copies of this film are now lost. However, the Vitaphone soundtrack, of music and effects, survive for the silent version.

See also
List of early Warner Bros. sound and talking features

References

Bibliography
 Roy Liebman. Vitaphone Films: A Catalogue of the Features and Shorts. McFarland, 2003.

External links

1928 films
1928 comedy-drama films
American comedy-drama films
Films directed by Ray Enright
1920s English-language films
American black-and-white films
Warner Bros. films
Lost American films
1928 lost films
Lost comedy-drama films
1920s American films